Dimitar Manchev was a Bulgarian stage and film actor born in 1934, deceased in 2009.

He is best known for the colourful character of Mitashki portrayed by him in the Bulgarian hit movie from the 1980s A Nameless Band. He is also known for the numerous roles on the stage, most notably as Kovadzhik in The Pig tails by Jaroslav Dietl, Shtatala in Tarelkin' death by Aleksandr Sukhovo-Kobylin, Mr. Fratyu in Uncles by Ivan Vazov and Orgon in Tartuffe by Molière.

Selected filmography

References

Sources

External links

Bulgarian male film actors
Bulgarian male stage actors
Bulgarian male television actors
1934 births
2009 deaths
Male actors from Sofia
20th-century Bulgarian male actors